The Treaty of Brno was signed on 7 June 1920 in Brno between representatives of Austria and Czechoslovakia.  Based on the terms of the treaty, both nations agreed to naturalize all populaces within their respective language groups.  Anyone, for example, who was an official resident of Austria (i.e., Heimatgemeinde) was automatically regarded as Austrian.  Individuals living in Austria prior to the hostilities of 1914 would be given special treatment while they are being naturalized.  Except for Jewish groups, many  Czechs, Slovaks, and Italians who migrated to Austria were able to easily acquire citizenship.

See also
List of treaties

References

Sources
Dale, Gareth and Cole, Mike. The European Union and Migrant Labour. Berg Publishers, 1999. .

Brno
History of Brno
1920 in Austria
Interwar-period treaties
Treaties concluded in 1920
Brno
1920 in Czechoslovakia
Austria–Czechoslovakia relations